Mount Airy is a neighborhood in Cincinnati, Ohio, United States. The population was 9,210 at the 2020 census. Interstate 74's Ohio-Iowa segment ends in Mount Airy, OH, while the westernmost North Carolina segment ends in Mount Airy, NC.

History
Mount Airy was incorporated as a village in 1865 from land given by Mill Creek and Green townships. Mount Airy was annexed by the City of Cincinnati in 1911.

The neighborhood includes the 1,471 acre Mt. Airy Forest, the largest of the Cincinnati parks. The Mt. Airy water tower, resembling a castle, was built in 1926-27. The complex includes 13 towers on two levels and has a capacity of 8.5 million gallons.

Demographics

Notable people
 Ken Griffey Jr., Hall of Fame baseball player
 Jo Ellen Pellman, actress

References

Neighborhoods in Cincinnati
Former municipalities in Ohio